Wojsk  is a village in Gmina Lipnica, Bytów County, Pomeranian Voivodeship, in northern Poland.

From 1975 to 1998 the village was in Słupsk Voivodeship. 

It had a population of 173.

Transport
Wojsk lies along the voivodeship road .

References

Map of the Gmina Lipnica

Wojsk